The South African Railways Class ES of 1936 was an electric locomotive.

In 1936, the South African Railways built two Class ES centre-cab electric shunting locomotives with a Bo+Bo wheel arrangement, based on the Class 1E mainline electric locomotive. Between then and 1964, more were acquired until a total of 24 Class ES locomotives were eventually in service. Four more were built new for industry in 1952 and 1957.

The Class ES was the fourth locomotive type to be designed and built in South Africa, after the Natal Government Railways 4-6-2TT Havelock of 1888, the Class 2C of 1910 and the Class 20 of 1935.

Design

During 1935, it was decided to replace steam shunting locomotives with electric shunting units at Daimana (Danskraal) in Ladysmith. A design for a centre-cab electric shunting locomotive, based on the Class 1E mainline locomotive which was originally designed by Metropolitan-Vickers (Metrovick), was prepared by A.G. Watson, Chief Mechanical Engineer of the South African Railways (SAR) from 1929 to 1936, in collaboration with the SAR Electrical Department.

Manufacturers
The first two Class ES locomotives were built new in Pietermaritzburg, where the bodywork was constructed in the SAR workshops. Two sets of spare Class 1E power bogies, complete with traction motors and gearing, were used. The wiring, control equipment and auxiliary machinery were installed at Daimana. These two units were initially numbered E96 and E97, but they were later renumbered to E500 and E501. They entered service at Daimana in 1936 as South Africa's first purpose-built electric shunting locomotives.

Even though it was not wholly a South African product with its imported Class 1E spare parts, the Class ES was the fourth recorded instance of locomotives designed and constructed in South African workshops, after the Natal Government Railways' engine Havelock of 1888, the Class 2C of 1910 and the Class 20 of 1935.

Over the next 28 years, more of these locomotives were built and by 1964 24 Class ES locomotives had been placed in service by the SAR. As can be expected in a locomotive type which was built by different manufacturers over a period of almost three decades, there are differences in appearance between locomotives.

Two batches of ten were built by the Nederlandsche Fabriek van Werktuigen en Spoorwegmaterieel (Werkspoor).
 Series 2, numbers E124 to E133, entered service in 1938 and were later renumbered in the range from E503 to E512.
 Series 3, numbers E515 to E524, entered service in 1953.

Series 4, numbers E525 and E526, the last two, were rebuilt from Class 1E locomotives in the SAR shops in 1964.
 No. E525 was rebuilt from Class 1E, Series 4 no. E114, originally built by Metrovick.
 No. E526 was rebuilt from Class 1E, Series 5 no. E146, originally built by Swiss Locomotive and Machine Works (SLM).

In 1952, two Class ES locomotives were built new for the Driefontein Consolidated Gold Mine (Dries) by Werkspoor, numbered 1 and 2. Another two were delivered new to the mine in 1957, numbered 3 and 4, also built by Werkspoor.

Characteristics
The locomotive body had three main sections. For the convenience of the driver and to afford him better outside vision, the cab was placed in the middle of the body, with the hoods of the machinery compartments tapering downwards from the cab. The "S" in the locomotive's class designation identifies it as a shunting locomotive, designed for and usually limited to yard work.

Their traction motors, connected in series on each bogie, operated on 1.5 kV DC.

Service
Although the class ES was initially largely confined to service in Natal, members of the class became quite common working on the Western Transvaal System in later years, mainly being employed around the Witwatersrand. Beginning in 1983, they were eventually replaced by the Class 8E, also a centre-cab shunting locomotive.

The locomotives were known by enginemen as Studebakers since the two long hoods either side of the cab were likened to a 1947 Studebaker Commander Business Coupe.

No. E511 is stored at Millsite Locomotive Depot in Krugersdorp awaiting possible restoration.

Works numbers
The builders, works numbers, years built and renumbering of the Class ES are listed in the table below.

Illustration
The main picture shows one of the first two Class ES locomotives to be built, c. 1936. Until the 1960s, they had a bottle green livery with red buffer beams. Some of the liveries which were applied to Class ES locomotives are illustrated below.

References

2710
2710
B-B locomotives
Bo+Bo locomotives
SAR locomotives
Werkspoor locomotives
Metropolitan-Vickers locomotives
SLM locomotives
Cape gauge railway locomotives
Railway locomotives introduced in 1936
1936 in South Africa